Plockton is a village in the Lochalsh, Wester Ross area of the Scottish Highlands with a 2020 population of 468.

Plockton settlement is on the shores of Loch Carron. It faces east away from the prevailing winds, and together with the North Atlantic Drift gives it a mild climate despite the far-north latitude, allowing the Cordyline australis palm to prosper.

History
Most of the houses date from the nineteenth and twentieth centuries. It was established as a planned fishing village on the northern edge of the Lochalsh, built ‘when introducing sheep farming in 1814-20 and removing the population from their old hamlets in Glen Garron, founded the villages of Jeantown and Plockton on Loch Carronside’ (Geddes: 1945, pp38).

Some maritime charts including MacKenzie (1776) and Heather (1804) mark the peninsula where the village sits as ‘Plack’, however it generally considered that the village was built on the ‘Ploc’ of Lochalsh, with ‘Ploc’ being understood in Gaelic as pimple or bump (of Lochalsh) sharing this with other places such as the Plock of Kyle and Plocrapool on the Isle of Harris. Its name in current form is based on the Gaelic name referring to the promontory, with the ‘-ton’ (from 'town') added to designate it as such in the English language, following the construction of the planned village around 1800.  Over time the name of village changed to its current contracted form ‘Plockton’.

Geography
Situated on a sheltered inlet of Loch Carron, and due to the series of New Zealand cabbage palm trees which have dominated Harbour Street since the 1960s, Plockton has a distinctive ‘sub-tropical appearance’ (Nicholson: 1975).  

The Church of Scotland house of worship in the village (also used by the Free Church of Scotland) was designed by Thomas Telford.

Tourism
The village is a tourist resort. The television series Hamish Macbeth, starring Robert Carlyle, was filmed there, substituting for the fictional Lochdubh.  Plockton was also used for various scenes in the film The Wicker Man and the Inspector Alleyn Mysteries television series.

Facilities
The village has a small general store with a café; a takeaway; a restaurant; newsagent and craft shop; three hotels with pubs; numerous B&Bs; library with free internet access and a village hall, which holds community events and art exhibitions.  It is served by Plockton railway station, on the Kyle of Lochalsh Line and the short Plockton Airfield for light aircraft and microlights.

Nearby is Duncraig Castle, a nineteenth-century stately home built by the Matheson family. The castle was derelict for many years, having had a variety of commercial uses.

Plockton has been a popular location for many artists including those from The Edinburgh School (Adam Bruce Thomson, David Macbeth Sutherland) and continues to attract artists.

Education
Plockton is home to Sgoil Chiùil na Gàidhealtachd - the National Centre For Excellence in Traditional Music at Plockton High School, which also serves the village and a wide surrounding area. The school also hosts the Am Bàta project teaching pupils in the art of boat building, from which a number of 'local' style boats have been produced. Some have been donated to the local sailing club - Plockton Small Boat Sailing Club - whilst others have been sold to the public.

Between the years of 1956 and 1972 Plockton was home to the Gaelic scholar Sorley MacLean, (Somhairle MacGill-Eain) whilst headmaster at the high-school, who introduced the teaching of Gaelic and championed shinty.

Since 1991 Plockton Primary School has accommodated a Gaelic-medium education unit (GMU) where instruction is through the medium of Gaelic. 24.4% of the population in the catchment area of Plockton Primary School reports being able to speak Gaelic – the highest incidence of Gaelic-speaking on the mainland of Scotland.

Football club
From 1954 the village played host to Plockton Amateur Football Club. However, from 2016, the club has been in abeyance. 
Plockton FC played at the Alasdair Ross Memorial Park and competed in yellow and black strips - reflected in their "Bumble Bees" nickname.  
They were formerly members of the Skye & Lochalsh Amateur League.

Media

Climate
The MetOffice operates a weather station at Plockton, for which 30 year averages are available. As with the rest of the British Isles, Plockton experiences a maritime climate with cool summers and mild winters. The highest temperature was 27.7 °C recorded on May 9, 2016, and the lowest was –9.8 °C.

See also
Port an Eòrna

References

External links 

 Plockton web portal for visitors: accommodation, eating out etc
 Plockton community site: news, events, local clubs etc
 The Kyle Line
 Hamish Macbeth at Scotland The Movie
 Panorama of Plockton (QuickTime required)

 
Populated places in Lochalsh
Villages in Highland (council area)